The following is a list of indoor arenas.

Africa

Asia

Europe

North America

Canada

United States

Oceania

South America

See also
Arena
Stadium
Sport venue
Lists of stadiums
List of buildings
List of music venues

Notes

External links

Ballparks by Munsey and Suppes – Also info on NBA and NHL indoor arenas
Hockey arenas in Europe
VisitingFan.com-Reviews of stadiums and arenas